Ida Lilian Slater (1881–1969) was a British geologist who made important contributions to the study of conulariids. She was jointly awarded the Daniel Pidgeon Fund with Helen Drew (funding awarded in 1907 and 1906 respectively) to undertake field work investigating the Palaeozoic rocks of Wales.

Early career
Slater and Helen Drew arrived at Newnham College, Cambridge in 1900 to study geology as part of their degrees.

Slater was secretary of the Sedgwick Club, Cambridge in 1903. Part of her development as a geologist was gained at the Sedgwick Club in Cambridge. She was a member from 6 May 1902 until 1905, and was their honorary secretary from mid-1903 until 9 February 1904. During the later years of her degree, she occasionally attended meetings as a visitor until her final recorded attendance on 27 February 1906 (Sedgwick Club notebooks, Archives of the University of Cambridge, Sedgwick Museum of Earth Sciences).

Career
Slater collaborated with Gertrude Elles on the stratigraphy of the Lower Palaeozoic (Elles and Slater 1906) of Wales.

After undertaking research, she was appointed a demonstrator for Catherine Raisin, employed to help run the department and laboratories, at the new laboratory rooms for geology and botany (established 1897) at Bedford College (London) in 1910. She held that post for two years.

In 1910 Slater published the results of her research into the Palaeozoic of Wales jointly with Helen Drew.

Family life
Slater married William Lees in 1912 in Hampstead.

Publications
Drew, H. and Slater, I.L. 1910. Notes on the geology of the district of Llansawel, Carmarthenshire. 
Elles, G.L. and Slater, I.L. 1906. The highest Silurian rocks of the Ludlow district. Quarterly Journal of the Geological Society of London, 62, 195–221.
Slater, Ida L. 1907. A monograph of British Conulariae. Monograph of the Palaeontographical Society. 40p., 5 leaves of plates: ill.; 28 cm.

References

1881 births
1969 deaths
Alumni of Newnham College, Cambridge
20th-century British geologists
People from Hampstead
Scientists from London